William Watson (born Richard Watson, 11 September 1890 – 1 September 1955) was an English international association footballer who played as a wing half in The Football League either side of World War I.

He made over 340 league appearances for Burnley, and was capped on three occasions by England.

Outwith football he was an ironmonger and also worked in his father's trade of painter and decorator. In World War I he served with the Royal Army Service Corps and was later a local councillor for the Liberal Party in his hometown of Southport.

References

1890 births
1955 deaths
Footballers from Southport
English footballers
Association football wing halves
Burnley F.C. players
Accrington Stanley F.C. (1891) players
Fulham F.C. wartime guest players
Southport F.C. players
Blackburn Rovers F.C. players
English Football League players
England international footballers
English Football League representative players
FA Cup Final players
Royal Army Service Corps soldiers
Councillors in Lancashire
British Army personnel of World War I